Orthaga onerata is a species of snout moth in the genus Orthaga. It is found in Japan.

References

Moths described in 1879
Epipaschiinae
Endemic fauna of Japan
Moths of Japan